Mezium affine is a species of beetle in the family Ptinidae. Its common names include shiny spider beetle, northern spider beetle, and hood spider beetle. It occurs throughout the Northern Hemisphere, and it is an introduced species in Australia.

The abdomen is reddish brown to black, and the legs, antennae, and other parts are cream-colored. The head, thorax, and legs have a coating of scaly yellowish or gray hairs. The rounded body shape earned it the common name spider beetle. It is coated in yellowish hairs.

The larvae infest stored food and other products. They are known to live on grain, spices, fish meal, dog biscuits, dried fruit, dried meat, dried mushrooms, seeds, wool, hair, feathers, skins, book bindings, dead insects, feces, and sugar. It can be found in libraries and museums, where it may damage specimens and collections.

References

Ptinidae
Taxa named by Anatole Auguste Boieldieu
Beetles described in 1856